Engine is the third studio album by Die Warzau, released on February 28, 1995 by TVT and Wax Trax! Records. It was the band's first album in over two years and upon release was considered a masterpiece of industrial music.

Reception

William Cooper of AllMusic championed Engine as one of the greatest industrial albums of all times and a marked improvement over the band's previous output in both sonic and stylistic variety. He calling the album "a major leap forward for Die Warzau, as it contains some of its most hard-hitting (and surprisingly pop-friendly) material" and that "the mixture of moods and musical approach shows astonishing artistic depth." Alternative Press praised the Die Warzau's musical craftmanship and careful attention to details, saying "with Engine they've achieved true mastery of the electronic craft" and "the skilled mixings of genres and styles is mere child's play for them." Option lauded the band for complex configuration of funk, free jazz, house and world music in complex configurations but decried the shallowness of the band's message, saying "Engine may be loaded with advanced socialist ideals and sharp commentary on such horrid sins as materialism and oppression, but the only people who are going to stand up and listen are the already techno-converted." Tony Fletcher of Trouser Press said the album "gets busy with crashing beats, distorted vocals and disorienting sonic effects" and "what holds the disparate pieces together is invention and an overriding sense of fun. Even with the air is heavy, the mood stays upbeat."

Track listing

Accolades

Personnel
Adapted from the Engine liner notes.

Die Warzau
 Van Christie – guitar, keyboards, noises, production, engineering
 Jim Marcus – lead vocals, drums, percussion, bass guitar, production
 Jason McNinch – electronics, guitar, production, engineering

Additional performers
 Dan Agne – voice
 Martin Atkins – additional drums
 Nanette Cichon – piano
 Jerry – steel drum
 Algis Kizys – bass guitar
 Jason More – additional percussion
 Chris Randall – additional programming
 Vincent Signorelli – additional drums
 Louis Svitek – additional guitar
 Matt Warren – turntables, additional programming
 Jennifer Wilcox (as Levi) – bass guitar, additional vocals,
 Mars Williams – horns

Production and design
 Eric Arway – additional engineering
 Vanessa Cook – additional engineering
 Tom Coyne – mastering
 Steve Krason (as Mudhead) – additional engineering
 Steve Levy – additional engineering
 Scott Ramsayer – additional engineering
 Matt Warren – additional engineering, production (9)
 Stephen Yates – additional engineering

Release history

References

External links 
 Engine at iTunes
 

1995 albums
Die Warzau albums
TVT Records albums
Wax Trax! Records albums